The V.League 1 clubs in the AFC Champions League. This details the participation and performances in the competition since its based at 2002 as a result of the merger between the Asian Club Championship, the Asian Cup Winners' Cup and the Asian Super Cup.

Participations
 GS : Group Stage, R16 : Round of 16, QF : Quarterfinals, SF : Semifinals, RU : Runners-Up, W : Winners

Vietnamese Clubs Statistics

Hoàng Anh Gia Lai

Bình Định

Long An

Nam Định

SHB Đà Nẵng

Becamex Bình Dương

Viettel

Overall Statistics

By Clubs

Top scores
As of 21 April 2022

See also 
 Australian clubs in the AFC Champions League
 Chinese clubs in the AFC Champions League
 Indian football clubs in Asian competitions
 Indonesian football clubs in Asian competitions
 Iranian clubs in the AFC Champions League
 Iraqi clubs in the AFC Champions League
 Japanese clubs in the AFC Champions League
 Myanmar clubs in the AFC Champions League
 Qatari clubs in the AFC Champions League
 Saudi Arabian clubs in the AFC Champions League
 South Korean clubs in the AFC Champions League
 Thai clubs in the AFC Champions League

References

External links
 AFC Champions League Official website
 AFC Champions League on RSSSF

1960 establishments in North Vietnam
Football in Vietnam
Vietnamese football clubs in international competitions
Sports organizations established in 1960
Football clubs in the AFC Champions League